Just Dance 3 is a 2011 dance rhythm game released on the Wii, Xbox 360, and PlayStation 3 with Kinect and Move support respectively for the latter two. It is part of the Just Dance video game series published by Ubisoft originally on the Wii and the third main installment of the series. Just Dance 3 was announced shortly after the release of Just Dance 2 and was released for the Wii and Xbox 360 on October 7, 2011 in North America and October 11, 2011 in Australia and Europe and for the PlayStation 3 on December 6, 2011 in North America, December 8, 2011 in Australia and December 9, 2011 in Europe. Just Dance 3 received positive reviews from critics and is the best-selling third-party Wii game of all-time, with sales of 9.92 million.

Gameplay

Like its predecessors, up to four players can play to mirror on-screen dance choreography from over 40 songs, as they are judged on their ability to follow a dance routine to a chosen song. During gameplay, the progress bar is displayed above the boomboxes that blast out the five judgements, with stars being obtained during the song. Along with Solo and Duet modes, Just Dance 3 features a Dance Crew mode which allows 4 players to dance together, each with their own unique choreography, as well as playlists that group songs into different categories. Players can now choose which dancer to play as for a Duet or Dance Crew song. The lyrics for the Duet songs are now on the left side of the screen like Solo songs, and the pictograms for each dancer in Duet and Dance Crew songs are placed together on the right side. On the PS3 version, a toggable option for karaoke-styled lyrics, in the same vein as the Japanese exclusive Just Dance game on the Wii, Just Dance Wii, is included. For Dance Crew songs, the boomboxes that blast out the five judgements are located on the left side of each player's progress bar. Players can unlock gifts such as new songs, game modes, as well as Dance Mashups which combines different dance routines in this game and the previous two installments of the Just Dance series into one song. Returning features in the game include Non-Stop Shuffle, Speed Shuffle, Medley, Simons Says and Just Sweat.

The Wii and PlayStation 3 versions have a Hold My Hand dance mode, where two players can share a  Wii Remote or PlayStation Move Motion controller to dance. The Xbox 360 version has the ability to choose between the full version or the short version, and features two difficulties, "Easy", where the player can use only their hands to score, and "Normal", where the player can use their entire body to score, as well as a "Shout Out" feature that uses the Kinect's voice recognition function, respectively, to sing the colored on-screen lyric in light blue when an icon appears. If successful, an additional Mojo point is earned. It also features a Just Create mode in which players can create their own routines with the Kinect. They can be saved, shared with their friends online and be played just like any other Just Dance routine.

Track list 
The game features 57 songs.

Notes: 
In the Xbox 360 version, all the songs are listed alphabetically while in the Wii and PS3 versions, the songs are in the order listed below.
In the Xbox 360 version, the Dance Mash-Up for "Pump It" is unlocked as part of Uplay rewards.
In the Xbox 360 version menu "...Baby One More Time" does not appear first because it is credited as "Baby One More Time".
The Dance Mash-Up for "Gonna Make You Sweat (Everybody Dance Now)" is in the game's files on the disc, but never appears in the actual game itself.
In a Beta collage for the game, the testing before its release shows "Jungle Drum" by Emiliana Torrini. However, it was never in the game after the release and testing.

Downloadable content
Notes: 
Songs from previous Just Dance games, along with new songs, are downloadable content for Just Dance 3. The Xbox 360 version also has a free demo version, showing a short sample version of the song, with scores not being saved and Mojo Points are not added to the total.
Downloadable content is not available for the PlayStation 3. The four Wii exclusive tracks are in the main playlist instead.
Downloadable content is no longer available for the Wii following the removal of Wii Points and the shutdown of the Wii Shop Channel.

Packs

Reception

Critical reception
Ubisoft's third installment in the Just Dance series received mostly mixed to positive reviews from critics, receiving a 75.30%  of the Wii and a 69.70% for the Xbox 360 on GameRankings. With the most positive review for the Wii being from Nintendo Life giving a 9/10, and the most negative of which being Official Nintendo Magazine UK, giving it a 68/100. For the Xbox 360, the most positive review came from IGN, giving it an 8.5/10 and the most negative came from GamingExcellence, which gave it a 5.4/10.

Commercial performance
According to Gamasutra's weekly column, Just Dance 3 was the number one selling multi-platform game of the week in North America and Japan on the week of October 13, 2011 in the form of the Wii version, and was number two in the UK. This means that of all the games on all systems, the Wii version of Just Dance 3 was the week's best selling game overall in Japan and North America in those regions, and number two in the UK, only behind Forza Motorsport 4. The Xbox 360 version did not chart, meaning it failed to hit the top 5. Of the top 5 selling Wii games in Japan, North America and the UK, however, the game was number one in all regions. Just Dance 3 is the best-selling third-party Wii game, with over 9.92 million copies sold as of June 11, 2014.

Awards and nominations

British Academy Children's Awards

2012 Kids' Choice Awards

2012 Teen Choice Awards

Other releases

A Zellers Edition was released in Canada which included two exclusive songs which are Rihanna's "Only Girl (In the World)" and B.o.B's "Airplanes", which are also included in the PAL Xbox 360 version. The Target Edition in America is exactly the same as the Zellers Edition.

A Best Buy Edition was released in America which included two exclusive songs which are Katy Perry's "Teenage Dream" and "E.T." The PAL Special Edition is exactly the same as the Best Buy Edition.

References

External links
 Official site

2011 video games
Just Dance (video game series)
Dance video games
Fitness games
Music video games
Ubisoft games
Kinect games
PlayStation 3 games
PlayStation Move-compatible games
Video games developed in France
Wii games
Xbox 360 games